In linguistics, inverse copular constructions, named after Moro (1997), are a type of inversion in English where canonical SCP word order (subject-copula-predicative expression, e.g. Fred is the plumber) is reversed in a sense, so that one appears to have the order PCS instead (predicative expression-copula-subject, e.g. The plumber is Fred). The verb in these constructions is always the copula be (am, are, is, was, were). Inverse copular constructions are intriguing because they render the distinction between subject and predicative expression difficult to maintain. The confusion has led to focused study of these constructions, and their impact on the theory of grammar may be great since they appear to challenge the initial binary division of the sentence (S) into a subject noun phrase (NP) and a predicate verb phrase (VP) (S → NP VP), this division being at the core of all phrase structure grammars (as opposed to dependency grammars, which do not acknowledge the binary division).

Examples 
Inverse copular constructions involve nouns and noun phrases, but they do not allow the post-copula nominal to be a personal pronoun:

a. The cause of the riot is a picture on the wall.
b. A picture on the wall is the cause of the riot. 
c. *A picture on the wall is it. 

a. Fred is the plumber.
b. The plumber is Fred. 
c. *The plumber is he. 

The defining trait of the inverse copular constructions is that two counts of inversion appear to have occurred: the normal subject has inverted to a post-verb position, and the predicative nominal has inverted to the pre-verb position. The verb is a finite form of the copula 'be' (am, are, is, was, were). This type of inversion is generally NOT possible with other verbs.

Subject-verb agreement 
Inverse copular constructions where the inverted predicative expression is a noun phrase are noteworthy in part because subject-verb agreement can (at least in English) be established with the pre-verb predicative NP as opposed to with the post-verb subject NP, e.g.

a. The pictures are a problem. 
b. A problem is/??are the pictures. 

a. Those kids are an annoyance. 
b. An annoyance is/??are those kids. 

In the inverse copular constructions, the copula agrees with the singular predicative expression to its left as opposed to with the plural subject to its right. This phenomenon seems to be limited to English (and possibly French); it does not occur in related languages such as German, e.g.

a. Die Bilder sind ein Problem. 
'The pictures are a problem.'

b. Ein Problem sind/*ist die Bilder. 
'A problem are/is the pictures.'

Nor does it occur in some Romance languages, e.g. Italian:

a. Queste foto sono la causa della rivolta. 
'These photos are the cause of the revolt.'

b. La causa della rivolta sono/*è queste foto. 
'The cause of the revolt are/is the photos.'

The fact that English (unlike German and Italian) demands subject-verb agreement to occur with the pre-verb NP generates confusion about what should qualify as the subject NP. From a morphological point of view, the pre-verb NP in inverse copular constructions should count as the subject, but from the perspective of information structure (e.g. definiteness, old information, specificity), the post-verb NP should be the subject.

Importance for the theory of grammar 
Inverse copular constructions challenge one of the major dogmas of the theory of clause or sentence structure, i.e. that the two basic constituents of a sentence - the noun phrase (NP) and the verb phrase (VP) - are associated with the logical/grammatical functions of subject and predicate (cf. phrase structure rules and sentence). In fact, copular sentences that maintain the canonical groupings are not adequate on empirical grounds, since a very unorthodox left-branching structure is necessary, or if one rejects the canonical groupings and positions the subject inside a VP-like constituent, then one has to assume that the subject NP and copula verb can form a type of VP to the exclusion of the predicative expression.

See also

Copula
Dependency grammar
Discontinuity
Inversion
Subject-auxiliary inversion
Phrase structure grammar
Predicate
Predicative expression
Subject-verb inversion

Notes

References 

Heycock, C. and A. Kroch 1998. Inversion and equation in copular sentences. In A. Alexiadou et al. (eds) ZAS Papers in Linguistics 10. 71 - 87. Zentrum für Allgemeine Sprachwissenschaft, Berlin.
Mikkelsen, L. 2005. Copular clauses: Specification, predication, and equation. Linguistics Today 85. Amsterdam: John Benjamins.
Moro, A. 1997. The raising of predicates. Predicative noun phrases and the theory of clause structure, Cambridge Studies in Linguistics, Cambridge University Press, Cambridge, England.
Pereltsvaig, A. 2001. Copular sentences and the architecture of grammar, Ph.D. Thesis, McGill University, Canada.

Syntax
Generative syntax
Syntactic entities
Syntactic transformation